The 2005–06 season was the 94th season in the existence of Modena F.C. and the club's second consecutive season in the second division of Italian football. In addition to the domestic league, Modena participated in this season's edition of the Coppa Italia.

Players

First-team squad

Transfers

Pre-season and friendlies

Competitions

Overall record

Serie B

League table

Results summary

Results by round

Matches

Promotion play-off 

Mantova has a higher point total and thus advances to the finals.

Coppa Italia

References

Modena F.C. seasons
Modena